Thronion or Thronium may refer to: 
Thronion (Illyria)
Thronium (Locris)